Superstack may refer to:

The Inco Superstack, a superstructure in Canada
The SuperStack series of network switches manufactured by 3Com